Paul Lusi Perez (born 26 July 1986) is a Samoan rugby union player.

Career

Sevens

In 2005 and 2006, Perez was part of the Samoa sevens side. He was also a member of the Samoan side that played at the 2005 Rugby World Cup Sevens tournament in Hong Kong.

Taranaki

He then joined the 15-man version of the sport, moving to New Zealand, where he represented  between 2006 and 2009. He was also their leading try-scorer in the 2008 Air New Zealand Cup.

However, in May 2010, he was deported back to Samoa after being convicted on two counts of domestic assault on his pregnant partner.

Eastern Province Kings (2010)

He looked set to join RC Toulon in the French Top 14 competition for the 2010–11 season, but visa problems prevented him from making the move to France.

Instead, he joined South African provincial side  for their 2010 Currie Cup First Division season, scoring six tries in nine appearances to help the Kings win the First Division, but failing to win promotion to the Premier Division. A knee injury then ruled him out of the entire 2011 season.

Sevens and international rugby

In January 2012, it was announced that he signed a six-month deal as a medical joker for Top 14 team Castres Olympique, but visa problems again prevented him from joining up with them.

Instead, he was called up by the Samoa Sevens team for several legs of the 2011–12 IRB Sevens World Series. His good performance in this series lead to a call-up to Samoa national team for the 2012 IRB Pacific Nations Cup, where he made his debut against Tonga on 5 June 2012.

Eastern Province Kings (2012)

He scored five tries in eleven appearances and once more helped the Kings to win the First Division title, but once more missing out on promotion to the Premier Division.

He also won two prizes at the Kings' end-of-season awards ceremony, winning the "Media Player of the Year" and "Try of the Year" awards.

Eastern Province Kings (2014)

After more appearances with the Samoa sevens side, Perez once again suffered a knee injury which ruled him out of action for the rest of 2013. He signed a contract to join Top 14 team Biarritz on a three-year prior to the 2013–14 Top 14 season, but for a third time, his rugby career in France was thwarted by visa problems and he failed to arrive at the club.

Instead, he returned to the EP Kings. In March 2014, South African media sources reported that he was set for a move back to the  prior to the 2014 Currie Cup Premier Division campaign. He subsequently arrived in Port Elizabeth in April, with his move to the side pending a full recovery from a pre-existing knee injury. He spent the entire Currie Cup season undergoing rehabilitation for the knee injury and wasn't involved in any first team action. He was named in the EP Kings' training squad for the 2015 season, but his contract was terminated in November 2014 due to absenteeism.

Sharks (2015–)

Shortly after his dismissal from the Kings, Durban-based side the  announced that Perez joined them on a trial basis. He was included in their squad for the 2015 Super Rugby season.

Toulouse (2015)

French Top 14 side  signed Perez during the 2015–16 as a medical joker to replace the injured Yoann Huget, with Perez joining the side after 's elimination from the pool stage of the 2015 Rugby World Cup.

References

Samoan rugby union players
Eastern Province Elephants players
Taranaki rugby union players
Living people
1986 births
People educated at New Plymouth Boys' High School
Samoan emigrants to New Zealand
People deported from New Zealand
Samoan expatriate rugby union players
Expatriate rugby union players in South Africa
Samoan expatriate sportspeople in South Africa
People educated at Whanganui City College
Samoa international rugby union players
Rugby union wings
Sharks (Currie Cup) players
Stade Toulousain players
Sharks (rugby union) players
Biarritz Olympique players